Rhaebolestes walkeri is a species of beetle in the family Carabidae, the only species in the genus Rhaebolestes.

References

Psydrinae